Devon Jerome Kelly-Evans (born 21 September 1996) is an English football who plays as a midfielder for Leamington.

Career
Kelly-Evans made his professional debut as a substitute on 23 August 2016 in a 6-1 Football League Cup defeat to Norwich City, coming on to replace Ben Stevenson after 67 minutes. Towards the end of the 2016–17 season, Devon Kelly-Evans was sent out on loan to Nuneaton Town, where he made 11 appearances and scored two goals.

On 12 September 2017, Devon Kelly-Evans made his league debut for Coventry City, replacing Stuart Beavon in the 87th minute of a 2–0 win over Carlisle United. He then scored his first senior goal for the Sky Blues in a 2–0 over Exeter City on 23 September 2017.

He was released by Coventry at the end of the 2017–18 season.

He signed for Nuneaton Borough on 15 June 2018 on a two-year deal. In August 2021 he moved up a league to local Warwickshire side Leamington. On 4 May 2022 Kelly-Evans scored the first goal for Leamington as they won the Birmingham Senior Cup 3-1 against Stourbridge.

Career statistics

Club

Personal life
Kelly-Evans is the twin brother of Notts County player Dion Kelly-Evans.

References

External links
 Devon Kelly-Evans player profile at ccfc.co.uk
 
 
 N.b. The Press Association has mis-attributed an appearance made on 10 September 2016 by Dion Kelly-Evans to Devon Kelly-Evans.

1996 births
Living people
English footballers
Footballers from Coventry
Association football midfielders
Coventry City F.C. players
Nuneaton Borough F.C. players
Leamington F.C. players
English Football League players
National League (English football) players
Black British sportspeople